Torii Kotondo (21 November 1900 – 13 July 1976) or Torii Kiyotada V was a Japanese painter and woodblock printer of the Torii school of ukiyo-e artists. He followed his school's tradition of making prints of kabuki actors (yakusha-e) and involvement with commercial work for kabuki theater. His twenty-one bijin-ga (pictures of beautiful women) are particularly celebrated.

Life and career

Kotondo was born Saitō Akira in the Nihonbashi district of Tokyo.  , the seventh head of the Torii school of ukiyo-e artists, adopted Kotondo at age 15 and trained him in the school's specialty producing yakusha-e, portraits of kabuki actors.  Kotondo studied painting under the yamato-e painter  from 1914 and under Kiyokata Kaburagi from 1918.  Most of Kotondo's woodblock prints date from 1927 to 1933.

Kiyokata influenced Kontodo's bijin-ga portraits along with shin hanga designers Goyō Hashiguchi and Itō Shinsui.  In 1925 he exhibited some of his bijin-ga at the Inten exhibition. He designed twenty-one prints of bijin-ga which typically  were sold in the United States. Seventeen of Kontodo's prints were shown at the seminal shin hanga exhibition at the Toledo Museum of Art in 1936.

Authorities considered Kotondo's print Morning Hair of 1930 provocative and banned it after seventy of its hundred copies had sold and had the remaining thirty destroyed. 

When Kiyotada died in 1941 Kotondo became the eighth head of the school and took the name Kiyotada V.

Kotondo lectured at Nihon University in Tokyo from 1966 to 1972.  Collectors did not place high value on Kotondo's prints while he was alive; the prints have since appreciated in collectability and fetch prices comparable to those of the great masters.

References

Works cited

External links
 Torii Kotondo at ukiyo-e.org

1900 births
1976 deaths
Artists from Tokyo
Shin hanga artists
Torii school